Shenzhen Open University, formerly known as Shenzhen Radio and TV University, is an educational institute in Shenzhen, China, headquartered in Luohu district, with branches in 4 other districts.

References

External links
Official site in Chinese

Universities and colleges in Shenzhen